Aysuak (Aysıwaq) is a rural locality (a selo) in Yermolayevsky Selsoviet, Kuyurgazinsky District, Bashkortostan, Russia. The population was 1,123 as of 2010. There are 13 streets.

Geography 
Aysuak is located 3 km southwest of Yermolayevo (the district's administrative centre) by road. Yermolayevo is the nearest rural locality.

References 

Rural localities in Kuyurgazinsky District